Patricio Antonio Jiménez Díaz (born 23 June 1976), referred as Patricio Jimenez Diaz, is a Chilean former professional footballer who played as a defender.

Biography
Born in Villa Alegre, Chile, he played for ten different Indonesian clubs since 2004. At the end of 2012, it was said he had received an offer from Spanish club Zaragoza, but he continued playing in the archipelago.

Following his playing career, he began a managerial career in Indonesia.

References

External links

Living people
1975 births
People from Linares Province
Association football defenders
Chilean footballers
Rangers de Talca footballers
Deportes Linares footballers
Malleco Unido footballers
Provincial Osorno footballers
Semen Padang F.C. players
Sriwijaya F.C. players
Persib Bandung players
PSMS Medan players
Persisam Putra Samarinda players
Bontang F.C. players
PSIS Semarang players
Persitara Jakarta Utara players
Persikad Depok players
Primera B de Chile players
Tercera División de Chile players
Liga 1 (Indonesia) players
Chilean expatriate footballers
Chilean expatriate sportspeople in Indonesia
Expatriate footballers in Indonesia
Chilean football managers
Chilean expatriate football managers
Expatriate football managers in Indonesia